James Burman Gow (1862 – 6 August 1942) was a member of the New Zealand Legislative Council.

Gow was born in 1862 in Forfarshire, Scotland. He arrived in New Zealand as a boy and received his education at Otago Boys' High School. He married Agnes Alison Murray in 1886.

He was from Opotiki where he owned a mill. In the 1908 general election he was a candidate for the Bay of Plenty electorate, but he was beaten by William MacDonald in the second ballot. He was a member of the Legislative Council from 7 May 1918 to 6 May 1925; then 7 May 1925 to 6 May 1932, when his term ended. He was appointed by the Reform Government.

He died on 6 August 1942 at his residence in Opotiki, and was survived by his wife, three sons and three daughters.

References 

1862 births
1942 deaths
Members of the New Zealand Legislative Council
Reform Party (New Zealand) MLCs
Unsuccessful candidates in the 1908 New Zealand general election
People educated at Otago Boys' High School